Western Military District (Milo V), originally III Military District was a Swedish military district, a command of the Swedish Armed Forces that had operational control over Western Sweden, for most time of its existence corresponding to the area covered by the counties of Gothenburg and Bohus, Älvsborg, Skaraborg (all three now joined as Västra Götaland County) and Halland. The headquarters of Milo V were located in Skövde.

History 
Milo V was created in 1966 along with five other military districts as part of a reorganisation of the administrative divisions of the Swedish Armed Forces. It can be seen as the successor of III Military District (III. militärområdet) created in 1942, but that did not have the same tasks as Milo V. The military district consisted of the land covered by the above-mentioned counties. In 1993, the number of military districts of Sweden was decreased to three, and as a consequence of that, Milo V was merged into the Southern Military District (Milo S).

Units 1989
In peacetime the Western Military District consisted of the following units, which were training recruits for wartime units:

 Western Military District (Milo V), in Skövde
 Army units:
 K 3 - Life Regiment Hussars, in Karlsborg
 Göta Signal Battalion
 Parachute Jäger Training Battalion
 Swedish Army Paratroop School
 Army Intelligence School
 Armed Forces Survival School
 P 4/Fo 35 - Skaraborg Regiment / Skaraborg Defense District, in Skövde
 I 15/Fo 34 - Älvsborg Regiment / Älvsborg Defense District, in Borås
 I 16/Fo 31 - Halland Regiment / Halland Defense District, in Halmstad
 I 17 - Bohuslän Regiment, in Uddevalla
 Lv 6 - Göta Air Defence Regiment, in Gothenburg
 T 2 - Göta Logistic Regiment, in Skövde
 Air Force units:
 E 1 - Attack Group, in Gothenburg, also controls F 15 - Hälsinge Wing of Milo NN
 F 6 - Västgöta Wing, in Karlsborg
 61st Attack Squadron, with AJ 37 Viggen attack aircraft
 62nd Attack Squadron, with AJ 37 Viggen attack aircraft
 F 7 - Skaraborg Wing, in Lidköping
 71st Attack Squadron, with AJ 37 Viggen attack aircraft
 72nd Attack Squadron, with AJ 37 Viggen attack aircraft
 71st Transport Squadron, with 8x C-130H Hercules and 4x Super King Air 200
 F 14 - Halmstad Air Force Schools, in Halmstad
 Air Force Officer College
 Air Force Command and Control School
 Air Force Technical School
 Air Force Ground Signal Engineering School
 Air Force Liaison and Staff Service School
 Navy units:
 MKV/Fo 32 - West Coast Naval Command / Gothenburg & Bohus Defense District, in Gothenburg
 12th Helicopter Group, at Säve Airfield with CH-46B Sea Knight anti-submarine and Bell 206B utility helicopters
 KA 4 - Älvsborg Coastal Artillery Regiment, in Gothenburg
 Three 75mm Tornpjäs m/57 batteries on Galterö, Marstrand and Stora Kornö islands, with the latter covering the entrance to the Gullmarn Naval Base 
 HSwMS Kalvsund (11) minelayer
 HSwMS Grundsund (15) minelayer
 48th Patrol Boat Division in Gothenburg (part of 4th Surface Attack Flotilla of Milo S), with 4x Hugin-class patrol boats
 HSwMS Hugin (P151)
 HSwMS Munin (P152)
 HSwMS Magne (P153)
 HSwMS Mode (P1514

In wartime the Western Military District would have activated the following major land units, as well as a host of smaller units:
 3rd Division, in Skövde
 PB 9 - Skaraborg Brigade, in Skövde, a Type 63M armoured brigade based on the P 4 - Skaraborg Regiment
 IB 15 - Västgöta Brigade, in Borås, a Type 66M infantry brigade based on the I 15 - Älvsborg Regiment
 IB 17 - Bohus Brigade, in Uddevalla, a Type 66M infantry brigade based on the I 17 - Bohuslän Regiment
 IB 45 - Älvsborg Brigade, in Borås, a Type 77 infantry brigade based on the I 15 - Älvsborg Regiment
 IB 46 - Halland Brigade, in Halmstad, a Type 77 infantry brigade based on the I 16 - Halland Regiment
 IB 47 - Gothenburg Brigade, in Uddevalla, a Type 77 infantry brigade based on the I 17 - Bohuslän Regiment

Heraldry and traditions

Coat of arms
The coat of arms of the Western Military District Staff 1983–1993. Blazon: "Azur, an erect sword with the area letter (V - West) surrounded by an open chaplet of oak leaves, all or."

Commanding officers

Military commanders

1942–1949: Folke Högberg
1949–1950: Sven Ryman
1950–1951: Carl Årmann
1951–1955: Sven Colliander
1955–1957: Thord Bonde
1957–1963: Richard Åkerman
1963–1966: Fale Burman
1966–1968: Oscar Krokstedt
1968–1972: Henrik Lange
1972–1978: Claës Skoglund (leave of absence 1974-1977)
1974–1976: Lennart Ljung (acting)
1976–1980: Nils Personne 
1980–1983: Kjell Nordström
1983–1985: Bengt Rasin
1985–1989: Jan Enquist
1989–1993: Bertel Österdahl

Deputy military commanders
1942–1946: Helmer Bratt
1946–1950: Carl Årmann (acting)
1951–1955: Gustaf Källner
1955–1959: Carl Fredrik Lemmel
1959–1966: Carol Bennedich

Chiefs of Staff

1941–1943: Per Gösta Fridolf Jörlin
1943–1946: Fritz-Ivar Virgin
1946–1949: Bo Klint
1949–1951: Sven Holmberg
1951–1955: Gustav Frisén
1955–1961: Liss Johan Tage Broms
1961–1965: Sture Fornwall
1966–1968: Claës Skoglund
1968–1969: Nils Sköld
1969–1973: Bengt Liljestrand
1973–1977: Bengt Rasin
1977–1979: Robert Lugn
1979–1980: Gustaf Welin
1980–1982: Jan Enquist
1982–1984: Torsten Engberg
1984–1988: Magnus Olson
1988–1990: Nils Rosenqvist
1990–1992: Svante Kristenson
1993–1993: Vacant

Names, designations and locations

See also
Military district (Sweden)

References

Notes

Print

Web

Further reading

V
Disbanded units and formations of Sweden
Military units and formations established in 1942
Military units and formations disestablished in 1993
1942 establishments in Sweden
1993 disestablishments in Sweden
Skövde Garrison